Hollyweird is the sixth studio album by American glam metal band Poison, released on May 21, 2002 through Cyanide Music and debuted at No. 103 on The Billboard 200 chart and No. 8 on the Independent Albums chart and sold 11,000 copies in its first week. As of 2022, it is the band's most recent album of original material.

Musical style
The record brought together Poison's original line-up for the first full studio project since Flesh & Blood. The result was a combination of old and new sounds, with guitarist C. C. DeVille frequently preferring pop and punk rock sounds to the heavy metal style that had characterized Poison's previous records. The band's new style was particularly evident in the songs "Emperor's New Clothes", "Livin' In the Now" and "Home (C.C's Story)", which featured DeVille on lead vocals.

Production and marketing
In the face of major label offers that would have required the band to re-record old material, the band decided to release the album through their own label, Cyanide Music. Hollyweird was recorded at Henson Recording Studios, in Hollywood, California and Rock Central Studios in Sherman Oaks, California with producer Thom Panunzio and engineer bob koszela.

Songs
The album's themes revolve almost exclusively around the trials and tribulations of success in Hollywood, California—a theme that had previously been explored in the band's single "Fallen Angel" from their second album Open Up And Say... Ahh!.

The first single released from the album was Rockstar, which was released on the web as a preview for the album; the second single was a cover of The Who song "Squeeze Box".

Bobby Dall on The Who cover "Squeeze Box"

"Shooting Star" was also released as a single for the album and was referred to as part 2 to the Fallen Angel single from Open Up And...Say Ahh.

Track listing

Band members
 Bret Michaels - lead vocals,
 C.C. DeVille - lead guitar, backing vocals
 Bobby Dall - bass, backing vocals
 Rikki Rockett - drums, backing vocals. 
Dan Wagner – keyboards
Mark “Small Face” Poole – backing vocals
Christy Calabro – backing vocals
Cliff Calabro – backing vocals

Singles
"Rockstar" - May 27, 2001
"Squeeze Box" - March 4, 2002
"Shooting Star"  - November 5, 2002

Charts

References

Poison (American band) albums
2002 albums
Albums produced by Thom Panunzio